Rolf Stübe is an Australian jazz bassist. At the ARIA Music Awards of 1998, he was nominated for ARIA Award for Best Jazz Album for Rolf Stübe and the Jazz Police. It was recorded with John Harkins (piano), Warwick Alder (trumpet), Alan Turnbull (drums) and Jason Morphett (saxophones). Stübe died soon after the recording of the album.

Discography

Albums

Awards and nominations

ARIA Music Awards
The ARIA Music Awards is an annual awards ceremony that recognises excellence, innovation, and achievement across all genres of Australian music. They commenced in 1987. 

! 
|-
| 1998
| The Jazz Police
| Best Jazz Album
| 
| 
|-

References

Australian jazz double-bassists
Year of birth missing
Place of birth missing
Year of death missing
Place of death missing